Power is a 2009 studio album by German electronic music artist Boys Noize.

Track listing

Charts

Release history

References

External links
 

2009 albums
Boys Noize albums